Pyrgulopsis perforata, is a species of minute freshwater snails with an operculum, aquatic gastropod molluscs or micromolluscs in the family Hydrobiidae.

This species is endemic to Grapevine Canyon and the Grapevine Mountains in the Amargosa River basin in Inyo County, California, United States.  Its natural habitat is springs.

Description
It has a larger distal lobe and smaller gland on the penis compared to other Pyrgulopsis.

References

 

Molluscs of the United States
perforata
Gastropods described in 2013